The PZL.4 was a Polish three-engine passenger aircraft for 10 passengers, built in PZL factory in 1932, which remained a prototype. It was the first Polish-designed and produced multi-engine plane.

Development
Despite purchasing a number of three-engine Fokker F.VIIb/3m aircraft, LOT Polish Airlines soon started looking for a more modern design and organized a design contest in 1928. The contest was won by the Polish engineer Zygmunt Bruner, working in the French Bernard works, with his design T-600. It was an all-metal high-wing three-engine monoplane, similar to Ford Trimotor.  State Aviation Works PZL decided to take over its development, and a group of engineers was sent to Paris and worked the design in 1929, under direction of Zygmunt Bruner. There were also carried out aerodynamic trials of a plane model. Detailed technical drawings were worked in PZL in Warsaw in 1930, under direction of Stanisław Prauss, and a prototype was built, designated PZL.4 (this designation was used before for a single-engine design worked out for a passenger plane contest in 1928, won by PWS-20).

The PZL.4 was a high-wing cantilever monoplane of metal construction, with closed cab and three engines. The fuselage was rectangular in cross-section, made of duralumin and covered with duralumin sheet. The two-spar wings and tailfins were covered with Wibault-pattern ribbed duralumin sheet. The wings had squared-off wingtips.  A crew of two (pilot and mechanic), were accommodated in front, before the wing, equipped with twin controls. Behind and slightly below under the wing, there was a cabin for 10 passengers in three compartments in the fuselage. The cabin had wide rectangular windows, sloped outwards for a better view, and door on the left side. The cabin had places for a baggage behind it and below a floor.

Three 9-cylinder Polish-Skoda J-5a Whirlwind radial engines mounted in the fuselage nose and in wing nacelles provided ( takeoff power and  nominal power. The engines were fitted with Townend rings and three-blade metal propellers, later two-blade wooden propellers of a fixed pitch. A conventional fixed landing gear, with a rear wheel, main gear wheels' diameter  was also fitted.

Operational history
The prototype was first flown on 8 January 1932 in Warsaw by Bolesław Orliński (markings SP-AGY). In June 1932 it took part in an international air meeting in Warsaw. From autumn 1932 to 1935 it was evaluated by LOT Polish Airlines, but it was found unsatisfactory. The empty weight was larger by 730 kg, over the design specification, which decreased performance. As a result, its performance was inferior to Fokker F.VIIb/3m, with the same engines. Proposals to use  Gnome-Rhône 7K or  Pratt & Whitney R-1340 Wasp engines were rejected by LOT (the latter engines would demand strengthening of construction).

The prototype cost was 1,416,110 złoty and it brought the manufacturer 663,000 złoty loss. The prototype was withdrawn from service in 1936 and scrapped in 1937.

Specifications

References

Further reading

External links
Photos and drawings at Ugolok Neba site

See also

1930s Polish airliners
04
Trimotors
High-wing aircraft
Aircraft first flown in 1932